Gugudan SeMiNa was the second official subgroup of South Korean girl group Gugudan, formed by Jellyfish Entertainment in 2018. It was composed of three Gugudan members: Nayoung, Sejeong and Mina.

History
On June 29, Jellyfish Entertainment announced that Sejeong, Mina and Nayoung will form a unit group and release a single album on July 10. They first appeared as Jellyfish Entertainment trainees on Mnet's survival show Produce 101 with a performance of "Something New" by Nikki Yanofsky. Jellyfish Entertainment revealed they would go by the name SeMiNa, composed of the first syllables of their names Sejeong, Mina, and Nayoung. On July 10, they released a self-titled single album featuring three tracks, including the lead single "SeMiNa."

Upon the disbandment of Gugudan, the subunit disbanded on December 31, 2020.

Members
 Nayoung — Leader
 Sejeong
 Mina

Discography

Single albums

Singles

Awards and nominations

Notes

References

 

 
Jellyfish Entertainment artists
K-pop music groups
Musical groups established in 2018
South Korean pop music groups
South Korean dance music groups
South Korean girl groups
Musical groups from Seoul
2018 establishments in South Korea
Produce 101 contestants